The General Secretary of the Central Committee of the Communist Party of Vietnam, known as First Secretary from 1960 to 1976, is the highest office within the Communist Party of Vietnam and the leader of Vietnam. The General Secretaryship was the second-highest office within the party when Hồ Chí Minh was Chairman, a post which existed from 1951 to 1969.  The general secretary is also the Secretary of the Central Military Commission, the leading Party organ on military affairs. For much of its existence, the general secretary has been leader of Vietnam. The current general secretary is Nguyễn Phú Trọng, and he is ranked first in the Politburo.

Trần Phú, one of the founding members of the Indochinese Communist Party, was the party's first general secretary. A year after being elected, he was sentenced to prison by the French authorities because of anti-French activities. He died in prison the same year. Trần's de facto successor was Lê Hồng Phong who led the party through the office of General Secretary of the Overseas Executive Committee (OEC). The OEC general secretary led the party because the Central Committee had been all but annihilated. Hà Huy Tập, the third general secretary, was removed from his post in March 1938, and was arrested by the authorities in May. Nguyễn Văn Cừ, the fourth general secretary, was arrested by the authorities in June 1940, and executed by shooting on 25 May 1941. He was succeeded by Trường Chinh in May 1941. An article in Nhân Dân on 25 March 1951 described Trường Chinh's role as the "builder and commander" of the revolution, while Hồ Chí Minh was referred to as "the soul of the Vietnamese revolution and the Vietnamese resistance". Trường Chinh was demoted as First Secretary in 1956 because of his role in the Land Reform campaign". Hồ Chí Minh took over the office of First Secretary, but quickly appointed Lê Duẩn acting First Secretary.  Duẩn was elected general secretary in 1960, and was the second only to Hồ Chí Minh until the latter's death on 2 September 1969.

From 2 September 1969 until his death on 10 July 1986, Duẩn was the undisputed leader of Vietnam. He died two months before the next National Party Congress. He was succeeded by Trường Chinh, the former general secretary who had served as the second-most powerful politician in Vietnam since Hồ Chí Minh's death. Trường Chinh was demoted from his post at the 6th National Party Congress, and was succeeded by Nguyễn Văn Linh. The Western press called Linh "Vietnam's Gorbachev" because of his reformist policies. Linh resigned because of bad health in 1991, and Đỗ Mười was appointed to the general secretaryship by the 7th National Congress. Mười ruled until 1997, when he was ousted from power by the reformist-wing of the party. Lê Khả Phiêu was Mười's successor, and he was elected as a compromise candidate. Phiêu was ousted in 2001, before the 10th National Party Congress, when the Central Committee overturned a decision of the Politburo; a majority in the Central Committee voted to remove Phiêu as general secretary. Nông Đức Mạnh succeeded Phiêu, and Manh came to be considered a moderniser. Manh was also the first general secretary with a university degree. Manh retired in 2011, and Nguyễn Phú Trọng succeeded him, and he now is considered the most powerful political figure in Vietnam.

The General Secretary presides over the work of the Central Committee, the Political Bureau, the Secretariat, and chairs meetings with key leaders (Working Regulation of the Central Committee, 2011).

Officeholders

See also 
 Executive Secretary of the Communist Party of Vietnam
 General Secretary of the Chinese Communist Party
 General Secretary of the Workers' Party of Korea
 General Secretary of the Communist Party of the Soviet Union

Notes

References

Bibliography

 
 
 
 * 
 
 
 
 
 
 
 
 
 

 
Central Committee of the Communist Party of Vietnam
Lists of political office-holders in Vietnam
V